Subodha Jayawardene (born 21 August 1980) is a Sri Lankan former cricketer. He played in 41 first-class and 25 List A matches between 1999/00 and 2006/07. He made his Twenty20 debut on 17 August 2004, for Moors Sports Club in the 2004 SLC Twenty20 Tournament.

References

External links
 

1980 births
Living people
Sri Lankan cricketers
Kurunegala Youth Cricket Club cricketers
Moors Sports Club cricketers
Sportspeople from Kurunegala